Janet S Gaffney is an American-New Zealand special education academic. She is currently a full professor at the University of Auckland.

Academic career

After an undergraduate at Saint Louis University and the University of Missouri Gaffney did a 1984 PhD at Arizona State University titled  LD children's prose recall as a function of prior knowledge, instruction, and context relatedness. After working in the US at the University of Mississippi and the University of Illinois she moved to the University of Auckland in 2012 as full professor, drawn in part by the legacy of Marie Clay, whose celebratory book, Stirring the Waters: The Influence of Marie Clay, Gaffney had already co-edited.

Selected works 
 Gaffney, Janet S., and Richard C. Anderson. "Trends in reading research in the United States: Changing intellectual currents over three decades." Handbook of reading research 3 (2000): 53–74.
 Packard, Jerome L., Xi Chen, Wenling Li, Xinchun Wu, Janet S. Gaffney, Hong Li, and Richard C. Anderson. "Explicit instruction in orthographic structure and word morphology helps Chinese children learn to write characters." Reading and Writing 19, no. 5 (2006): 457–487.
 Jeong, Jongseong, Janet S. Gaffney, and Jin-Oh Choi. "Availability and use of informational texts in second-, third-, and fourth-grade classrooms." Research in the Teaching of English (2010): 435–456.
 Gaffney, Janet S., and Richard C. Anderson. "Two-tiered scaffolding: Congruent processes of teaching and learning." Center for the Study of Reading Technical Report; no. 523 (1991).
 Scruggs, Thomas E., Margo A. Mastropieri, Joel R. Levin, and Janet S. Gaffney. "Facilitating the acquisition of science facts in learning disabled students." American Educational Research Journal 22, no. 4 (1985): 575–586.

References

External links
  
 
 

Living people
Year of birth missing (living people)
New Zealand women academics
New Zealand educational theorists
University of Missouri alumni
Arizona State University alumni
University of Mississippi faculty
University of Illinois faculty
Academic staff of the University of Auckland
American emigrants to New Zealand
New Zealand women writers